An artist initiated school is a platform started by artists as a project, an alternative to institutional academia, or as a framework for artists working collaboratively.

Historical
 Black Mountain College
 Bauhaus

Contemporary
 Bruce High Quality Foundation University
 Feminist Studio Workshop at the Woman's Building
 Sundown Schoolhouse – by Fritz Haeg
 Copenhagen Free University 
 The School of Panamerican Unrest – by Pablo Helguera
 Center for Urban Pedagogy

Art Schools in the United States